Zilla is a genus of orb-weaver spiders first described by C. L. Koch in 1834.

Species
 it contains four species:
Zilla crownia Yin, Xie & Bao, 1996 – China
Zilla diodia (Walckenaer, 1802) (type) – Europe to Azerbaijan
Zilla globosa Saha & Raychaudhuri, 2004 – India
Zilla qinghaiensis Hu, 2001 – China

References

External links 

Araneidae
Araneomorphae genera
Spiders of Asia